Rasmus Djerf (born August 8, 1993) is a Swedish ice hockey player. He is currently a free agent having last played for Kalmar HC of the Hockeyettan.

He played two games in the Elitserien for HV71 during the 2012–13 Elitserien season.

References

External links

1993 births
HV71 players
IK Oskarshamn players
Living people
Nybro Vikings players
Swedish ice hockey right wingers
Västerviks IK players